Besh Korechi Prem Korechi is a 2015 Indian Bengali language action comedy film directed by Raja Chanda and produced jointly by Shrikant Mohta, Mahendra Soni and Nispal Singh under the banners of Shree Venkatesh Films and Surinder Films.

The film features Jeet, Koel Mallick, Kharaj Mukherjee, Puneet Issar and Ashish Vidyarthi in lead roles. It is a remake of Telugu Movie Loukyam.

Cast

Jeet as Aditya
Koel Mallick as Rai
Kharaj Mukherjee as Nepal Das
Puneet Issar as Raghav Sinha, a gangster and an industrialist
Ashish Vidyarthi as Dibakar (Rai's elder brother)
Shataf Figar as Deva, Dibakar's younger brother (Rai's Brother)
Sumit Ganguly as Mehboob
Biswajit Chakraborty as Prabhu (Aditya's Father)
Tulika Basu as Aditya's mother
Soumili Biswas as Madhushree Das
Vivaan Ghosh as Bhaskar
Subhashish Mukherjee as Tab Shastri 
Supriyo Dutta as Kanai Da
Koena Mitra as Kajal
Trina Saha as Rai's friend

Soundtrack

References

External links
 

Bengali-language Indian films
2010s Bengali-language films
2015 films
Bengali remakes of Telugu films
Indian action comedy films
Indian romantic comedy films
Films directed by Raja Chanda
Films scored by Jeet Ganguly
2015 action comedy films
2015 romantic comedy films